This is a list of episodes for the light-hearted British period drama Born and Bred, set in the 1950s. It aired from 21 April 2002 to 3 August 2005. There are 37 episodes in total: 36 in all 4 series including 1 Christmas special. Series 1, Series 2, the Christmas Special and Series 3 were shown on Sundays, while Series 4 was shown on Wednesdays.

Every Born and Bred episode comprises the following cast members: James Bolam (Dr. Arthur Gilder), Michael French (Dr. Tom Gilder), Jenna Russell (Deborah Gilder), Maggie Steed (Phyllis Woolf), John Henshaw (Wilf Bradshaw), Naomi Radcliffe (Jean Bradshaw), Charlotte Salt (Helen Gilder), Clive Swift (Rev. Eustacius Brewer), Samuel J. Hudson (Eddie Mills), Ross Little (Michael Gilder), Polly Thompson (Catherine Gilder), Peter Gunn (PC Lennard Cosgrove), Tracey Childs (Linda Cosgrove), Donald Gee (Horace Boynton), Richard Wilson (Dr. Donald Newman), Oliver Milburn (Dr. Nick Logan) and Kelly Harrison (Nancy Brisley).

Episodes

Series 1 (2002)

Series 2 (2003)

Christmas Special (2003)

Series 3 (2004)

Series 4 (2005)

Lists of British period drama television series episodes